Przeczek is a Polish surname. Notable people with the surname include:

 Gustaw Przeczek (1913–1974), Polish poet
 Wilhelm Przeczek (1936–2006), Polish writer and poet

Polish-language surnames